Seco Herrerano is an alcoholic beverage distilled from sugar cane. It is distilled three times. It is traditionally used straight or in mixed drinks as a replacement for rum or vodka. It is a clear liquor that is sold at 35 percent alcohol by volume (70 US proof). Seco Herrerano is made by the Varela family who invented the Seco in 1908, is the most widely available and popular of all brands. Varela Hermanos produces more than a million cases of Seco every year and it is sold to more than 65 countries around the world.

Seco Herrerano can be mixed with almost anything, from tropical fruits to liquors. One of the more famous drinks made with seco is "Chichita Panamá", made with grapefruit and pineapple juice.  On the Atlantic side of the country, Seco Herrerano is drunk even with milk (colloquially known as "seco con vaca") and coconut milk.

Other names
 Seco
 Nueve Letras
 Vuelve Loco

References

External links
Varelahermanos.com

Rums
Panamanian brands
Panamanian cuisine